Verticordia lehmannii is a flowering plant in the myrtle family, Myrtaceae and is endemic to the south-west of Western Australia. It is slender shrub with only a few branches, well-spaced, oppositely arranged leaves and small heads of pale pink to silvery flowers with a dark pink centre.

Description

Flowering time is mainly from December to April.

Taxonomy and naming
Verticordia lehmannii was first formally described by Johannes Conrad Schauer in 1844 from specimens collected by Ludwig Preiss and the description was published in Plantae Preissianae.

The specific epithet (lehmannii) honours Johann Georg Christian Lehmann, the editor of Plantae Preissianae.

When he reviewed the genus Verticordia in 1991, Alex George placed this species in subgenus Verticordia, section Catocalypta along with V. roei, V. inclusa, V. apecta, V. insignis, V. habrantha and V. pritzelii.

Distribution and habitat
This verticordia grows in sand, in areas that are wet in winter, and in swamp, heath and shrubland. It only occurs in the extreme south-west of Western Australia, between Busselton and the Scott River area in the Jarrah Forest, Swan Coastal Plain and Warren biogeographic regions.

Conservation
Verticordia lehmannii is classified as "Priority Four" by the Western Australian Government Department of Parks and Wildlife, meaning that is rare or near threatened.

Use in horticulture
This verticordia has been grown from cuttings but these are difficult to establish and maintain. More success has been achieved with grafting onto Darwinia citriodora rootstock, producing plants that are bushy and vigorous after 3 or 4 years.

References

lehmannii
Rosids of Western Australia
Eudicots of Western Australia
Plants described in 1844